Mizusawa (written: 水沢 lit. "water swamp") is a Japanese surname. Notable people with the surname include:

Bert Mizusawa (born 1957), United States Army general
, Japanese model and actress
, Japanese voice actress
, Japanese voice actress
, Japanese manga artist
, Japanese actress

Japanese-language surnames